Brookton is an unincorporated village in Washington County, Maine, United States. It lies within the North Washington unorganized area and is not part of any township. Brookton has a post office with ZIP code 04413.

References

Villages in Washington County, Maine
Villages in Maine